Yangbi Yi Autonomous County is a county of the Dali Bai Autonomous Prefecture located in the west of Yunnan Province, China.

Administrative divisions
Yangbi Yi Autonomous County has 4 towns and 5 townships. 
4 towns

5 townships

Climate

References

External links
 Yangbi County Official Website

County-level divisions of Dali Bai Autonomous Prefecture
Yi autonomous counties